Lake Upemba is a lake in Bukama, Haut-Lomami District, the Democratic Republic of the Congo. It, and nearby Lake Kisale, is surrounded by the Upemba Depression in Upemba National Park. The nearest town is Nyonga, and the nearest hospital is located four hours away in Kikondja.

The floating islands in the lake, such Mitala Island, are also the site of an informal refugee settlement that resulted from the fighting between Mai-Mai rebels and government troops since 2006.

References

Upemba
Haut-Lomami
Upemba National Park